That's the Short and Long of It is an EP by New Zealand band Tall Dwarfs, released in 1985.

Track listing

Side A
"Nothing's Going To Happen" - 06:05
"Nothing's Going To Stop It" - 06:18

Side B
"The Hills Are Alive" - 02:04
"Clover (Take 1)" - 01:48
"Pretty Poison" - 01:53
"Sleet" - 02:07
"Burning Blue" - 02:57
"Carpetgrabber" - 02:03
"Gone To The Worms" - 02:20
"Woman (Live 84)" - 04:40
"Get Outta The Garage" - 02:56
"Scrapbook" - 01:45

References

Tall Dwarfs albums
1985 EPs
Flying Nun Records EPs